See You in the Morning may refer to:

 See You in the Morning (film), a 1989 American romantic comedy film
 See You in the Morning (album), a 2005 album by Mint Royale